Neville Callam is a Jamaican  Baptist minister, theologian, and General Secretary Emeritus of the Baptist World Alliance.

Early life and education
Callam was born in Jamaica to a committed Baptist family, his father a deacon and his mother involved in other ministries. He discovered his own Christian faith as a teenager.

Callam was educated at the United Theological College of the West Indies, the University of the West Indies, and Harvard Divinity School and was ordained in 1977.

Career
In his pastoral ministry Callam has served as senior pastor of the Grace/Mineral Heights and Tarrant/Balmagie Circuits. He is also an academic specialising in Christian ethics and theology and has taught at the United Theological College of the West Indies, the Caribbean Graduate School of Theology, and Jamaica Theological Seminary, and, as a visiting lecturer, at Barbados Baptist College. He has also served on the University Council of Jamaica, the accrediting body for colleges and universities in Jamaica. He has written five books and published journal articles and book chapters. He is a popular speaker at forums, symposiums, seminars and workshops throughout the world.

Callam has also enjoyed a career in the media. He created and ran The Breath of Change (TBC FM), a religious radio station, and was a founding director of the National Religious Media Company of Jamaica, the operator of LOVE FM and LOVE TV. He has also served as Chairman of the Board of the Public Broadcasting Corporation of Jamaica.

Callam has a long career in the service of the Jamaica Baptist Union. He has held the positions of chairman of the media commission, general treasurer, acting general secretary, and finally, president, serving terms 1985-87 and 2000-02. He has been vice president of the Caribbean Baptist Fellowship and from 2000 until 2005 he was vice president of the Baptist World Alliance, having served on many of its committees, commissions, and workgroups, including the general council and executive committee. On 6 July 2007 he was elected General Secretary of the BWA during a meeting of the general council at Accra.

Callam has been married for over thirty years and has two children.

References

External links 
 
 

Living people
Year of birth missing (living people)
Baptist theologians
20th-century Protestant theologians
Baptist writers
Jamaican television people
Jamaican Baptist ministers
Religion academics
Harvard Divinity School alumni
University of the West Indies academics
University of the West Indies alumni
20th-century Baptist ministers
21st-century Baptist ministers
Alumni of the United Theological College, Jamaica